A departure tax is a fee charged (under various names) by a country when a person is leaving the country.

Background 

Some countries charge a departure tax only when a person is leaving by air. In these cases, the departure tax can be de facto the same as the air passenger tax, although the latter can also apply to domestic flights that are therefore not departure taxes, as no international borders are crossed.

Various rules apply to the payment of the tax, including payment at the airport to those about to catch a flight (sometimes only in the local currency and sometimes by credit card), or by some prepayment method, or it may be charged to the airlines and included in the airline ticket price.

Departure taxes of various countries

See also
 Expatriation tax
Diploma tax

References

International taxation
Travel
Aviation taxes